Zelovo is a Croatian village in the Dalmatian hinterland in the Cetina region and at the foot of the southern slopes of the Svilaja mountain.

The village is located 50 km from Croatia's 2nd largest city – Split, in the district of Sinj, 14 km from the town of Sinj and 7 km from the village of Hrvace, which is also the next largest settlement near Zelovo.

The surroundings of the village include the mountains Plišivica, Gradina and Orlove Stine (part of Svilaja mountain with a steep face), which are known for the occasional settlement of griffon vultures during their migration to the island of Cres and towards the Julian Alps in Slovenia.

The village also houses the St. Vitus Church, patron saint of the village, and the village festival takes place on St. Vitus Day, 15 June.

The village is known for its autochthonous Zelovo tobacco pipe made of clay. These clay pipes are made only in Zelovo and nowhere else in Croatia. In addition to pipes, the inhabitants produced also cigarette holders, wooden toys, furniture, wood carving decoration objects and musical instruments ("diple"-flutes, flutes and stringed instruments). Almost every household in Zelovo was a production site for various craft items. There are few rural villages in Croatia where craftsmanship was so developed and promoted.

The most famous product, however, is the famous Zelovo tobacco pipe. The beginnings of pipe production were recorded in the first half of the 18th century, when families with surnames Delaš, Domazet and Jukić moved to Zelovo, where the pipes were made.

Other surnames are Barać, Gabrić, Jelavić, Jelčić, Marović and Šako.

Notable people 
 Joško Jelčić (football player / TV expert)
 Mario Delaš (basketball player)
 Ante Delaš (basketball player)
 Matko Jelavić (singer)

References 

Populated places in Split-Dalmatia County